AAKC may refer to:

 All-Africa Korfball Championship, sport competition, Africa
 Association d'amitié khmero-chinoise (Khmer–Chinese Friendship Association)